Peace line may refer to:

 Syngman Rhee Line, South Korean marine boundary line established in 1952 by Korean Prensident Rhee Syng-man
 Peace lines, separation barriers in Northern Ireland between predominantly Republican/Nationalist Catholic neighbourhoods and predominantly Loyalist/Unionist Protestant neighbourhoods